Kewish is a Celtic surname of Manx origin.

Background

 Pronounced Q-ish.
 A contraction of MacCuis, McCuish, MacKewsh or one of several variations of MacUais, "The Noble's Son". Colla Uais was the 121st Milesian Monarch of Ireland (322-326 AD). The name in this original form is first noted in Scotland, including The Uists, where Colla Uais was expelled with 300 followers by Muireadhach Tireach in 327 AD.
 It is speculated that descendants of this family either migrated between Scotland and Northern Ireland and finally settled in the Isle of Man (perhaps during the Dal Riata beginning in the 5th century), or later moved there directly when both Uist and Mann were parts of the Kingdom of the Isles (9th to 13th centuries).
 In its original form, the name has been recorded on the Manx Manorial Roll (M.R.) since its inception in the 15th century.
 It is first seen in its current form in the late 16th to 17th century when the "Mac" patronymic prefix disappeared from most Manx surnames. Kewishe (1580), Kewish (1618), Kevish (1653), Kewesh (1683).
 The MacCuish name continued to be present in North Uist at least until the 19th century.
 The Kewish name is currently found mainly in the United States, the United Kingdom, Australia, New Zealand and Canada.
 Notable bearers of this name include: John T. Kewish, principal inventor of the primer actuated machine gun in 1918; Jill Kewish, former owner of Rockmount Stud.; and Tori Kewish, Australian professional darts player.

Tracing of Manx Homesteads "Balla"

 Traditionally, Manx homesteads were named after their landholder and passed from generation to generation.  Over time family names can be seen to change.
 Ballakesh (Bride):  1515 M.R. - Moris MacComas (MacCowis), 1643 M.R. - Ballakewish, 1777 Diocesan Register - Ballakesh; "Kewish or MacCowis farm."
 Ballakewish (Braddan):  1703 M.R. - Ballakewish (Ir. MacThamhais); "Kewish farm."

See also
 Manx surnames
 History of the Isle of Man

References

 Moore, A. W., ed.  Manx Note Book, A Quarterly Journal of Matters Past and Present Connected with the Isle of Man, Number 8.  Douglas: G. H. Johnson, 1886, pp 153–158.
 Moore, Arthur William.  The Surnames and Place-names of the Isle of Man.  London:  Elliot Stock, 1890, pp 71–78.
 Comyn, D., Dinneen, P.S., trans.  History of Ireland by Geoffrey Keating [c. 1634].  London:  David Nutt, 1902, pp 355–372.

External links
 https://celt.ucc.ie/published/T100054/text057.html
 http://www.isle-of-man.com/manxnotebook/manxnb/v08p153.htm
 http://www.isle-of-man.com/manxnotebook/gazateer/balla.htm
 http://www.surnamedb.com/Surname/Kewish
 http://www.surnamedb.com/Surname/McCuish
 https://www.houseofnames.com/kewish-family-crest
 https://www.houseofnames.com/maccuish-family-crest

Surnames
Manx-language surnames
Surnames of Manx origin
Patronymic surnames